Golabad (also Romanized as Golābād) is a village in Piran Rural District, in the Central District of Piranshahr County, West Azerbaijan Province, Iran. At the 2006 census, its population was 98, in 16 families.

References 

Populated places in Piranshahr County